The 2017 Japanese motorcycle Grand Prix was the fifteenth round of the 2017 MotoGP season. It was held at the Twin Ring Motegi in Motegi on October 15, 2017. Andrea Dovizioso won his fifth race of the season after a last lap battle with championship leader Marc Márquez, shrinking his lead to 11 points with three rounds left to race. Danilo Petrucci finished in third place over 10 seconds behind the leaders, while Team Suzuki teammates Andrea Iannone and Álex Rins finished fourth and fifth respectively.

Report

Background 
During the previous round in Aragon, Marc Márquez won the race which extended his championship lead over Andrea Dovizioso to 16 points.

Jack Miller missed the weekend due to an injury sustained to his right tibia during a test two weeks before the race, former 250cc world champion and Honda test rider Hiroshi Aoyama replacing him throughout the weekend. Jonas Folger would also miss the race weekend due to a recurring battle with Epstein-Barr virus and would fly back to his home in Germany to recover, he was replaced by his team with Japanese rider Kohta Nozane.

Practice and Qualifying 
During both practice sessions on Friday, rain dominated the race track. On the first practice session, Marquez finished with the fastest time.

With rain still occurring throughout the second practice, Dovizioso would run the fastest time of the weekend with Márquez finishing 0.2 seconds behind despite nearly falling off his Honda when setting his laps. Surprisingly, Aleix Espargaró would set the third quickest time of the session, producing it on the last lap of the session, while Dovizioso's Ducati teammate Jorge Lorenzo finished fourth and Johann Zarco would finish fifth.

Both KTM's would qualify to Q2, with Pol Espargaro ending the session in first place and Bradley Smith in second.

At the beginning of Q2, Rossi grabbed attention by choosing to set his first laps on slick tyres with rain still falling on the track. With five minutes to go in the session, Rossi's decision to start on slick tyres didn't work, while Marquez made the decision to complete his second qualifying run on slick tyres. Zarco's pole would surprise everyone, despite the domination of Marquez and Dovizioso throughout the practice sessions. Marquez would qualify in third place, while Dovizioso qualified in ninth.

Race 
The race was conducted in pouring rain which was to remain throughout the entirety of the race, with concerns over water flooding the track and poor visibility for the riders, leaving doubts as to whether the race would be safe enough to run full distance. Márquez led the field into turn one, with Lorenzo leading the field after the first lap after an incredible start on his Ducati, while Zarco dropped to the middle of the field after a terrible start at pole position. Petrucci took the lead from Lorenzo during the second lap and would be joined by Marquez and Dovizioso on the same lap, with Lorenzo dropping to fourth by the third lap. Petrucci continued to extend his lead through most of the opening half of the race, leading the championship contenders by over a second. Rossi became the first casualty of the race, while catching up and passing teammate Vinales in eighth place he would lose control of his bike, sliding into a nearby gravel trap and was unable to get his bike restarted. 

As riders continued to battle throughout the entire field, the race conditions gradually became worse with tyre spray impacting rider visibility due to the close proximity and battles with fellow riders. With eleven laps to go, both Márquez and Dovizioso overtook Petrucci who would remain in third for the rest of the race with a "cat and mouse battle" happening between first and second. During lap 19, Dovizioso made his first overtake on Marquez for the lead, setting the fastest lap of the race in the previous lap and began opening up a slight 0.8 second lead. Three laps to go, Márquez took the lead back from Dovizioso and prepared to generate a slight lead throughout, which allowed Dovizioso to rethink a new strategy, to attack on the final lap. On the final lap, Márquez and Dovizioso had a slight 0.2 second gap between them, with Marquez the first to make a mistake by running wide and nearly high-siding off the bike at turn 8, which allowed Dovizioso room to pass him and take the lead. In a last ditch attempt to win, Marquez tried to overtake Dovizioso on the last corner, being able to get on the inside of the corner taking the lead back although would run ride when exiting the corner onto home straight, giving Dovizioso enough space to retake the lead and win the race.

Post-Race 
The race is said to have cemented Dovizioso's ability to be able to fight for a championship, which was highly debated throughout the season as he continued his surprise charge at the championship. Marquez remarked on the Ducati's incredible speed throughout the back straight as a weak point of his during the race, "I knew the Ducati was faster on the back straight, even in the braking point,"  when speaking about Dovizioso's victory Marquez stated he knew Dovizioso would be strong at Motegi as the track works to the Ducati's strengths, despite it being Honda's home track.

Classification

MotoGP

Moto2

Moto3

 Albert Arenas suffered a broken right hand in a crash during qualifying and withdrew from the event.

Championship standings after the race

MotoGP
Below are the standings for the top five riders and constructors after round fifteen has concluded.

Riders' Championship standings

Constructors' Championship standings

 Note: Only the top five positions are included for both sets of standings.

Moto2

Moto3

Notes

References

Japan
Motorcycle Grand Prix
Japanese motorcycle Grand Prix
Japan